Léon Gaston Genevier (18 June 1830, in Saint-Clément-de-la-Place, near Angers – 11 July 1880, in Nantes) was a French pharmacist and botanist.

During his career, he was a practicing pharmacist in Mortagne-sur-Sèvre and Nantes. Genevier is best remembered for investigations of the genus Rubus native to the Loire basin. He was an honorary member of the Société d'études scientifiques d'Angers.

Publications 
 Extrait de la florule des environs de Mortagne-Sur-Sèvre (Vendée), 1866 - Extrait on local flora in the vicinity of Mortagne-sur-Sèvre. 
 Essai monographique sur les Rubus du bassin de la Loire, 1869 - Monograph on Rubus found in the Loire basin.
 Etude sur les champignons consommés à Nantes sous le nom de champignon rose ou de couche (Agaricus campestris L.), 1876
 Premier supplément à l'essai monographique sur les "Rubus" du bassin de la Loire - First supplement to the monograph on Rubus'' of the Loire basin.

References

External links
 

1830 births
1880 deaths
People from Maine-et-Loire
French pharmacists
19th-century French botanists